The Summer Tour 2016 was the eleventh concert tour by Canadian singer Celine Dion. It was organized to support Dion's fifteenth French-language and twenty-sixth studio album, Encore un soir (2016), released on 26 August 2016. It was Dion's first tour since the Sans attendre Tour in 2013. With 28 shows, it was also her biggest Francophone tour since the D'eux Tour in 1995–96. The show began in Antwerp, Belgium on 20 June 2016 and concluded on 31 August 2016 in Trois-Rivières, Québec. The Summer Tour 2016 grossed $56 million.

Background
On 9 November 2015, Dion's official website announced six shows in the province of Quebec: four in Montreal and two in Quebec City. Owing to incredibly high demand, six additional shows have been added in Montreal, and two in Quebec City, totaling fourteen North American dates. On 11 November, two shows in Paris were announced, followed by two in Antwerp the following day. Due to high demand on the first day of general ticket sales for the Paris shows, four more dates were added. An additional date in Quebec City and two extra shows in Paris were announced in March 2016. Following the death of Dion's husband, René Angélil, it was announced that the upcoming French album would not be released until later in 2016.

On 12 April 2016, Dion announced she would be performing a benefit concert at the newly built Amphithéâtre Cogeco in Trois-Rivières, Québec on 30 August 2016. The show will benefit Foundation Céline Dion. A second show on 31 August was announced on 31 May 2016. These were to be Dion's only outdoor venue concerts of the tour.  On 10 May 2016, Dion announced on her official website that she added another show to her series of concerts at the AccorHotels Arena. Following 8 sold-out shows, an additional date was added on 9 July 2016.

During this tour Dion performed songs from her old catalogue that she has rarely or never done live (mainly from 1 fille & 4 types): "Et je t'aime encore", "Le vol d'un ange", "Apprends-moi", "Ne bouge pas", "Valse adieu", "Tous les secrets", "Tous les blues sont écrits pour toi" and "Vole". In addition, Dion performed three new tracks from the Encore un soir album: "Trois heures vingt", "Encore un soir" and "Ordinaire". In Montreal "À la plus haute branche" was added to the setlist as a new track replacing "Un garçon pas comme les autres (Ziggy)". Before the first concert in Montreal Dion met its writer, Daniel Picard. On 31 July "Je n'ai pas besoin d'amour" was exclusively included in the set list. Unlike previous tours, Dion performed without wardrobe changes, although she had used different costumes on different dates.

Commercial reception
The launch of Dion's summer tour in Europe topped Billboards Hot Tours ranking of the week's highest-grossing tours. The tour kicked off with a two-night stint at the 20,000-seat Sportpaleis in Antwerp, with sellout crowds on 20 and 21 June 2016, followed by a nine-show stand at AccorHotels Arena in Paris from 24 June through 9 July 2016. Combined, the eleven shows - all sellouts - sold 141,800 tickets and brought in $23.2 million. In Paris, the gross of over $18.4 million from 110,052 sold seats made the nine-show run the fourth-highest-grossing concert engagement of 2016.

Dion also sold out her concerts in Canada. She has sold 138,164 tickets in Montreal grossing $16.1 million and 67,368 tickets in Quebec City with gross of $8.6 million. Dion's two benefit concerts, which took place in Trois-Rivières, raised $1.7 million for the Fondation Céline Dion. The tour grossed $56 million in total becoming one of the most successful tours of 2016. Céline is 10 on the Pollstar 2016 Year End Top 100 worldwide tours with a total gross of $85.5 million.

Broadcasts and recordings
For the final concert in Paris, on 9 July 2016, Dion's Facebook page live-streamed the first six songs of the show: "Trois heures vingt", "Encore un soir", "Je crois toi", "Qui peut vivre sans amour?", "Immensité" and "Et je t'aime encore".

First three songs from the 1st Canadian concert have also been streamed on the radio in Quebec. After the first concert in Montreal Celine held a press conference which was streamed on Facebook.

The performance of "My Heart Will Go On" was recorded on 1 August 2016 in Montreal and was shown on ABC's Greatest Hits Live Finale: 1980-2005 on 4 August 2016.

A TV special called "Céline Dion: Accès Illimité" aired on TVA on 2 October 2016. It included various excerpts of different songs from various stages of the tour. 

On 19 October 2017, as a part of Spirit Day, Celine shared on Facebook the performance of "Purple Rain" which was recorded in Montreal on 4 August 2016.

Set listAdditional Notes'
"Un garçon pas comme les autres (Ziggy)" was performed only in Europe
"Je n'ai pas besoin d'amour" was performed only once in Montreal on 31 July 2016, its author Jean-Pierre Ferland attended the show that day
"À la plus haute branche" was performed only in Canada

Sources:

Band

 Musical Director, Piano: Scott Price
 Drums: Dominique Messier
 Bass: Yves Labonté
 Guitars: Kaven Girouard
 Keyboards: Guillaume Marchand 
 Percussion: Paul Picard 
 Background Vocals & Tin Whistle: Élise Duguay
 Background Vocals: Barnev Valsaint, Dawn Cumberbatch
 Violins: Philippe Dunnigan, Jenny Elfving, Laraine Kaizer, Rebecca Ramsey, Svetlin Belneev, Lisa Dondlinger, Lenka Hajkova, John Arnold, De Ann Letourneau
 Violas: Jerome Gordon, Kaila Potts, Dmitri Kourka, 
 Celli: Lindsey Springer, Raymond Sicam III, Irina Chirkova, Judy Kang, Élise Duguay
 Woodwinds: Eric Tewalt, Philip Wigfall
 Trumpets: Matt Fronke, Kurt Evanson, Nico Edgerman, Don Lorice
 Trombones: Daniel Falcone, Nathan Tanouye

Shows

These concerts benefited Foundation Céline Dion.

References

2016 concert tours
Celine Dion concert tours